Ryan Rivett (born 2 May 2002) is an Australian professional rugby league footballer who currently plays for the Newcastle Knights in the National Rugby League.

Background
Born in Gosford, New South Wales, Rivett moved to the Gold Coast, Queensland as a youngster and played his junior rugby league for the Burleigh Bears, before being signed by the Cronulla-Sutherland Sharks.

He is of Indigenous Australian descent.

Playing career

Early years
Rivett played for the Cronulla-Sutherland Sharks' S. G. Ball Cup team in 2021, and the Jersey Flegg Cup team in 2022.

2023
In 2023, Rivett joined the Newcastle Knights and trained with the NRL side during the pre-season, also playing in a trial match against the Sharks. In round 3 of the 2022 NRL season, he made his NRL debut for the Knights against the Dolphins.

References

External links
Newcastle Knights profile

2002 births
Australian rugby league players
Indigenous Australian rugby league players
Newcastle Knights players
Rugby league halfbacks
Rugby league players from Gosford, New South Wales
Living people